The  ("Koma flute") is a transverse bamboo flute, a fue that is used in traditional Japanese court music.

Construction
The komabue is typically constructed from bamboo. It is a transverse flute with six finger-holes. It is 36 cm, shorter than the ryuteki flute.

Use
The komabue is used in both Gagaku and Komagaku. Historically the Oga family of musicians in Japan specialized in the komabue.

References

Side-blown flutes
Gagaku
Japanese musical instruments
Bamboo flutes